Franz Kneisel (born January 26, 1865, Bucharest - died March 26, 1926, New York) was a violinist and music teacher. He completed early musical training at the Bucharest Conservatory and moved to Vienna in 1879, where he studied under Jakob Grün. He was concertmaster for the Bilse Orchestra in Berlin during 1884-1885 and then moved to the United States, where he was first violinist for the Boston Symphony Orchestra (1885-1903). He founded the Kneisel Quartet in 1886. His students included Joseph Fuchs, Lillian Fuchs, William Kroll, Elise Fellows White, and three of the founding members of the Musical Art Quartet (named after the Institute for Musical Art where Kneisel taught in the late 1910s): Sascha Jacobsen, Bernard Ocko, and Louis Kaufman.

References

Nicholas Slonimsky, "Franz Kneisel". Baker's Biographical Dictionary of Musicians (mirror at Encyclopedia.com).

German violinists
People from Bucharest
German conductors (music)
1865 births
1926 deaths

de:Franz Kneisel